The First Baptist Church of Fond du Lac is a church located in Fond du Lac, Wisconsin. It was added to the National Register of Historic Places in 1986 for its architectural significance.

References

Churches on the National Register of Historic Places in Wisconsin
Baptist churches in Wisconsin
Gothic Revival church buildings in Wisconsin
Churches completed in 1907
Churches in Fond du Lac County, Wisconsin
National Register of Historic Places in Fond du Lac County, Wisconsin